František Šimůnek (born 2 April 1908, date of death unknown) was a Czech weightlifter. He competed in the men's featherweight event at the 1936 Summer Olympics.

References

External links
 
 

1908 births
Year of death missing
Czech male weightlifters
Olympic weightlifters of Czechoslovakia
Weightlifters at the 1936 Summer Olympics
Place of birth missing